The Gravesend Town Pier is located in Gravesend, Kent. It was designed by William Tierney Clark and built in 1834 on the site of the earlier Town Quay. Over 3 million passengers were served between 1835 and 1842, but around 1900, this pier fell into disuse due to the arrival of the railways.

In 2000, this site was restored by the Gravesham Borough Council, partly funded by the organisations English Heritage, English Partnerships, Heritage Lottery Fund, Kent County Council, and Manifold Trust. In 2002, this renovation project was finished. They had also added a restaurant and a bar to the pier. When reopened, the Gravesend Town Pier was initially successful, but it later became a fiscal failure.

Gravesend town pier is the oldest surviving cast iron pier in the world and is a Grade II* listed building.

Current services
Since 2012 the Gravesend–Tilbury Ferry has run from the Town Pier. 
On 4 November 2022, Thames Clippers announced that they had completed the purchase of the Pier, with an aim to operate a long-term River Bus service from Gravesend within 2-3 years. In recent years they have operated select sailings into Central London during high season.

Mention of the pier in other media

It is the setting of the 2017 song "Gravesend Pier" by Gone Molly, which describes a scene of poverty and wealth in nineteenth century England.

See also 

 List of piers

References

Further reading

External links 
View of the Gravesend town pier
National Piers Society entry for Gravesend Town Pier

Piers in Kent
Gravesend, Kent
Architecture in the United Kingdom